Polk County is one of the 36 counties in the U.S. state of Oregon. As of the 2020 census, the population was 87,433. The county seat is Dallas. The county is named for James Knox Polk, the 11th president of the United States.

Polk County is part of the Salem, OR Metropolitan Statistical Area, which is also included in the Portland-Vancouver-Salem, OR-WA Combined Statistical Area. It is located in the Willamette Valley.

History

The Oregon Provisional Legislature created Polk County from Yamhill District on December 22, 1845, granting to it the entire southwestern portion of present-day Oregon to the California border. County boundaries were periodically changed to reflect the creation of Benton and Lincoln counties.  Many other counties were subsequently carved out of these as settlement spread towards the south, leaving Polk County many counties away from its former border with California.

The first county seat was a settlement on the north side of Rickreall Creek named Cynthian (also known as Cynthia Ann). In 1852 city officials renamed Cynthian to Dallas after Vice President George M. Dallas, vice president (1845–1849) to James Polk. During the 1880s and 1890s, there were a series of unsuccessful efforts to move the county seat to nearby Independence.

Geography

About two thirds of Polk County, the western part, is forest, mostly of the coniferous and mixed varieties, bordering on temperate rain forest around Laurel Mountain, the wettest place in Oregon.

The eastern half of the county lies in the Willamette Valley. The Willamette River forms the eastern border of the county, separating it from neighboring Marion County.

Adjacent counties
Tillamook County (northwest)
Yamhill County (north)
Marion County (east)
Linn County (southeast)
Benton County (south)
Lincoln County (west)

National protected areas
Baskett Slough National Wildlife Refuge
Siuslaw National Forest (part)

Demographics

2000 census
As of the census of 2010, there were 75,403 people, 28,288 households, and 19,545 families living in the county.  The population density was 102 people per square mile (39/km2).  There were 30,302 housing units at an average density of 41 per square mile (16/km2).  The racial makeup of the county was 85.9% White, 0.6% Black or African American, 2.1% Native American, 1.9% Asian, 0.3% Pacific Islander, 5.4% from other races, and 3.8% from two or more races.  12.1% of the population were Hispanic or Latino of any race.

There were 28,288 households in 2010, out of which 32.4% had children under the age of 18 living with them, 54.2% were married couples living together, 10.3% had a female householder with no husband present, and 30.9% were non-families. 23% of all households were made up of individuals, and 9.8% had someone living alone who was 65 years of age or older.  The average household size was 2.60 and the average family size was 3.06.

In the county, the population was spread out, with 24.3% under the age of 18 and 14.8% 65 years of age or older.  The median age was 37.1 years. For every 100 females, there were 94.8 males.  For every 100 females age 18 and over, there were 91.8 males.

As of the 2000 census, the median income for a household in the county was $42,311, and the median income for a family was $50,483. Males had a median income of $36,667 versus $26,272 for females. The per capita income for the county was $19,282.  About 6.30% of families and 11.50% of the population were below the poverty line, including 12.50% of those under age 18 and 5.50% of those age 65 or over.

2020 census
As of the 2020 census, there were 87,433 people, 30,305 households,. The racial makeup of the county was 85.9% white, 2.1% American Indian, 1.9% Asian, 0.6% black or African American, 0.3% Pacific islander, 5.4% from other races, and 3.8% from two or more races. Those of Hispanic or Latino origin made up 12.1% of the population. In terms of ancestry, 22.4% were German, 16.4% were English, 10.4% were Irish, and 6.4% were American.

Of the 28,288 households, 32.4% had children under the age of 18 living with them, 54.2% were married couples living together, 10.3% had a female householder with no husband present, 30.9% were non-families, and 23.0% of all households were made up of individuals. The average household size was 2.60 and the average family size was 3.06. The median age was 37.1 years.

The median income for a household in the county was $50,975 and the median income for a family was $61,418. Males had a median income of $46,616 versus $35,371 for females. The per capita income for the county was $24,345. About 8.8% of families and 12.9% of the population were below the poverty line, including 17.2% of those under age 18 and 6.8% of those age 65 or over.

Politics
Though Polk County is located in western Oregon, politically it falls in line with the eastern side of the state. The majority of registered voters who are part of a political party in Polk County, as well as most rural counties in Oregon, are members of the Republican Party.

In the 2012 presidential election, 50.54 percent of Polk County voters voted for Republican Mitt Romney, while 46.21 percent voted for Democrat Barack Obama, and 3.25 percent either voted for a Third Party candidate or wrote in a candidate. These numbers show a shift toward the Republican candidate when compared to the 2008 presidential election, in which 48.92% of Polk County voters voted for Republican John McCain, while 48.43 percent voted for Barack Obama, and 2.64 percent either voted for a Third Party candidate or wrote in a candidate. Obama's 2008 performance was the best by a Democrat since Lyndon Johnson carried the county in 1964; the only other Democrats to ever carry Polk County have been Franklin Roosevelt in 1932 and 1936, Woodrow Wilson in 1912, and William Jennings Bryan in 1896. However, Polk's Republican lean has been thinning in recent years. Republicans managed to win 50% or more of the county's vote only three times since 1992.

Presidential Elections

Economy
The major industries of the county are agriculture, forest products, manufacturing, and education. Western Oregon University in Monmouth is a major employer.

Communities

Cities
Dallas (county seat)
Falls City
Independence
Monmouth
Salem (part)
Willamina (part)

Census-designated places
Eola
Fort Hill
Grand Ronde
Rickreall

Unincorporated communities

Airlie
Ballston
Bethel
Black Rock
Bridgeport
Brunks Corner
Buena Vista
Crowley
Ellendale
Lewisville
McCoy
Modeville
Pedee
Perrydale
Salt Creek
Suver
Valley Junction
Valsetz
Zena

Education
K-12 school districts include:
 Amity School District 4J
 Central School District 13J
 Dallas School District 2
 Falls City School District 57
 Perrydale School District 21
 Philomath School District 17J
 Salem-Keizer School District 24J
 Sheridan School District 48J
 Willamina School District 30J

All of Polk County is within the Chemeketa Community College district.

See also
National Register of Historic Places listings in Polk County, Oregon

References

Further reading
 H.O. Lang (ed.), History of the Willamette Valley: Being a Description of the Valley and its Resources, with an Account of its Discovery and Settlement by White Men, and its Subsequent History; Together with Personal Reminiscences of its Early Pioneers. Portland: Himes and Lang, 1885.
 Portrait and Biographical Record of the Willamette Valley, Oregon, Containing Original Sketches of Many Well Known Citizens of the Past and Present. Chicago: Chapman Publishing Co., 1903.

External links
 

 
1845 establishments in Oregon Country
Populated places established in 1845
Salem, Oregon metropolitan area